Anemonastrum canadense, synonym Anemone canadensis, the Canada anemone, round-headed anemone, round-leaf thimbleweed, meadow anemone, windflower, or crowfoot, is a herbaceous perennial flowering plant in the family Ranunculaceae. It is native to moist meadows, thickets, streambanks, and lakeshores in North America, spreading rapidly by underground rhizomes. It is valued for its white flowers.

Description
The Canada anemone has shoots with deeply divided and toothed basal leaves on  petioles. They grow from ascending caudices on long, thin rhizomes.

Flowers with about 5 white, petal-like sepals and 80-100 yellow stamens bloom from late spring to summer on stems above a cluster of leaves.

When they are pollinated, the green pistils in the middle of the flower become a rounded to slightly lengthened seed head. The seeds are achenes, with an almost round body and a beak.

Taxonomy
The species was first described in 1768 by Carl Linnaeus, as Anemone canadensis. As traditionally and broadly circumscribed, the genus Anemone has repeatedly been shown not to be monophyletic, with genera such as Clematis and Pulsatilla embedded within it. As part of creating monophyletic genera, Sergei Mosyakin expanded the genus Anemonastrum to include Anemone canadensis as Anemonastrum canadense.

Distribution
Anemonastrum canadense is native to Canada and the west central and eastern United States.

Uses
Anemonastrum canadense was used medically by North American Indigenous peoples as an astringent, as a styptic for wounds, sores, nosebleeds, and as an eyewash. The root was respected by Plains tribes and used for many ailments.

Toxicity
It is likely that most anemones contain similar caustic irritants to other members of the family Ranunculaceae.

References

canadense
Flora of Canada
Plants used in traditional Native American medicine
Flora of the United States
Plants described in 1768